"White Rabbit" is a song written by Grace Slick and recorded by the American rock band Jefferson Airplane for their 1967 album Surrealistic Pillow. It draws on imagery from Lewis Carroll's 1865 book Alice's Adventures in Wonderland and its 1871 sequel Through the Looking-Glass.

It was released as a single and became the band's second top-10 success, peaking at number eight on the Billboard Hot 100. The song was ranked number 478 on Rolling Stone's list of the 500 Greatest Songs of All Time in 2004, number 483 in 2010, and number 455 in 2021 and appears on The Rock and Roll Hall of Fame's 500 Songs that Shaped Rock and Roll.

History
"White Rabbit" was written and performed by Grace Slick while she was still with The Great Society. Slick quit them and joined Jefferson Airplane to replace their departing female singer, Signe Toly Anderson, who left the band with the birth of her child. The first album Slick recorded with Jefferson Airplane was Surrealistic Pillow, and Slick provided two songs from her previous group: her own "White Rabbit" and "Somebody to Love", written by her brother-in-law Darby Slick and recorded under the title "Someone to Love" by the Great Society. The Great Society's version of "White Rabbit" was much longer than the more aggressive version of Jefferson Airplane. Both songs became top-10 hits for Jefferson Airplane and have ever since been associated with that band.

Lyrics and composition

"White Rabbit" is one of Grace Slick's earliest songs, written during December 1965 or January 1966. It uses imagery found in the fantasy works of Lewis Carroll—1865's Alice's Adventures in Wonderland and its 1871 sequel Through the Looking-Glass—such as changing size after taking pills or drinking an unknown liquid.

Slick wrote the lyrics first, then composed the music at a red upright piano she had bought for US$50 with eight or ten keys missing—"that was OK because I could hear in my head the notes that weren't there"
—moving between major chords for the verses and chorus.  She said that the music was heavily influenced by Miles Davis's 1960 album Sketches of Spain, particularly Davis's treatment of the Concierto de Aranjuez (1939). She later said: "Writing weird stuff about Alice backed by a dark Spanish march was in step with what was going on in San Francisco then. We were all trying to get as far away from the expected as possible."

Slick said the composition was supposed to be a slap to parents who read their children such novels and then wondered why their children later used drugs. She later commented that all fairytales read to little girls have a Prince Charming who comes and saves them. But Alice did not; she was "on her own...in a very strange place, but she kept on going and she followed her curiosity – that's the White Rabbit. A lot of women could have taken a message from that story about how you can push your own agenda." Slick added that "The line in the song 'feed your head' is both about reading and psychedelics...feeding your head by paying attention: read some books, pay attention."

Characters Slick referenced include Alice, the White Rabbit, the hookah-smoking caterpillar, the White Knight, the Red Queen, and the Dormouse. Slick reportedly wrote the song after an acid trip.

For Slick, "White Rabbit" "is about following your curiosity. The White Rabbit is your curiosity." For her and others in the 1960s, drugs were a part of mind expansion and social experimentation. With its enigmatic lyrics, "White Rabbit" became one of the first songs to sneak drug references past censors on the radio. Even Marty Balin, Slick's eventual rival in Jefferson Airplane, regarded the song as a "masterpiece". In interviews, Slick has related that Alice in Wonderland was often read to her as a child and remained a vivid memory well into her adulthood.

In an interview with The Wall Street Journal, Slick mentioned that, in addition to Alice in Wonderland, her other inspiration for the song was Ravel's Boléro. Like Boléro, "White Rabbit" is essentially one long crescendo. The music combined with the song's lyrics strongly suggests the sensory distortions experienced with hallucinogens, and the song was later used in pop culture to imply or accompany just such a state.

The song was first played by the Great Society in a bar in San Francisco in early 1966, and later when they opened the bill for bigger bands like the Grateful Dead.  They made a series of demo records for Autumn Records, for which they were assisted by Sly Stone.  Grace Slick said: "We were so bad that Sly eventually played all the instruments so the demo would sound OK."  When Slick joined Jefferson Airplane later in 1966, she taught the song to the band, who recorded it for their album Surrealistic Pillow. "White Rabbit" is in the key of F-sharp which Slick acknowledges "is difficult for guitar players as it requires some intricate fingering".

Reception
Cash Box called it "a real strong outing guaranteed to get lots of attention."

Chart history

Weekly charts

Year-end charts

Cashbox (11 weeks): 59, 45, 23, 14, 12, 11, 8, 6, 7, 22, 41

Personnel
 Grace Slick – vocals
 Jorma Kaukonen – lead guitar
 Paul Kantner – rhythm guitar
 Jack Casady – bass
 Spencer Dryden – drums

In popular culture 
 A lyric from the song was used as the title of the 1971 novel Go Ask Alice.
 The song is featured in Platoon (1986 film).
 The song is featured in The Game (1997 film), a film directed by David Fincher, starring Michael Douglas and Sean Penn.
 The song was featured in Fear and Loathing in Las Vegas (1998 film). At one point during the main characters' drug binge, Dr. Gonzo (Benicio del Toro) demands that Raoul Duke (Johnny Depp) throw a tape player into the bathtub where Gonzo is riding out an acid trip at exactly the point "when White Rabbit peaks".
 The song was played in The Simpsons episode, D'oh-in' in the Wind (1998).
 The song was played in an episode of The Sopranos.
 In 2011 "White Rabbit" was performed by Emilíana Torrini for Sucker Punch. It was the sixth song used in the movie and the third on the soundtrack.
 The song was played in a trailer for The Matrix Resurrections. 
 The song was played in episode 9 "The Blue Scorpion" of The Twilight Zone (2019 TV series). 
 The song was played in an episode of Stranger Things.
 The song was played in an episode of Futurama, in which the head of Richard Nixon performs a portion of the song during his presidential campaign run.
 The song was played in an episode of Q Into the Storm, in a section depicting the January 6 United States Capitol attack.
 In September 2022, an a cappella version of the song began being played at WWE live events in commercial breaks, as well as at house shows. The company used Slick's isolated vocals from the song, tying into a "White Rabbit" tease including cryptic codes such as QR codes. In October 2022, at the Extreme Rules event, the tease was revealed to be a returning Bray Wyatt.
 The song is featured in the 2015 game Call of Duty: Black Ops III, during the final mission of the game.
 A cover by Eliot Sumner is the opening theme song of the Netflix series 1899, and the original version is played during the first episode.
 The song appeared in S1E8 of TV series The Handmaid's Tale.
 The song appeared in the film American Hustle.

References

External links
  
 

1967 singles
Jefferson Airplane songs
Blue Man Group songs
1980 singles
1983 singles
Music based on Alice in Wonderland
Songs written by Grace Slick
Songs about drugs
Songs about fictional male characters
Songs about fictional female characters
Songs about rabbits and hares
Song recordings produced by Rick Jarrard
Grammy Hall of Fame Award recipients
1967 songs
RCA Victor singles
RPM Top Singles number-one singles